Kristopher Evan Tyrpak (born March 19, 1992) is an American professional soccer player who plays as a forward.

Career

Early career
Raised in Dripping Springs, Texas, Tyrpak started his youth career with the Austin Capitals Soccer Club and Lonestar Soccer Club. He also played for Dripping Springs High School for four years, where he received several concussions. As a result, he now wears a head guard during matches. He went on to attend Houston Baptist University where he played college soccer for the Houston Baptist Huskies from 2010 to 2013. He also played for the Austin Aztex of the USL PDL from 2012 to 2013. After the 2013 season Tyrpak was named as the USL PDL MVP after scoring nine goals in 14 games while also recording one assist as the Aztex won the USL PDL title.

Chivas USA
On January 16, 2014, Tyrpak was drafted 40th overall in the 2014 MLS SuperDraft by Chivas USA. He then made his professional debut in Major League Soccer on March 16, 2014, against the Vancouver Whitecaps FC in which he came on in the 87th minute for Erick Torres as Chivas USA drew 1–1. On October 11, 2014, Tyrpak scored his first Major League Soccer goal against the Colorado Rapids, in which he dribbled around several players before entering the penalty box and scoring.

San Jose Earthquakes / Back to Aztex
After the folding of Chivas USA in November 2014, Tyrpak was selected in the 2014 MLS Dispersal Draft by San Jose Earthquakes. However, he was waived by San Jose on February 26, 2015, during their pre-season. He re-signed with the Aztex, now playing in the USL, on March 11, 2015.

Swope Park Rangers
On December 16, 2015, Tyrpak signed for newly formed USL club Swope Park Rangers. Tyrpak scored his first goal for the Swope Park Rangers on April 27 in a game against Vancouver Whitecaps FC 2.  Tyrpak helped the team advance to the USL Western Conference Championship.

San Antonio FC
San Antonio FC announced the signing of Tyrpak for the 2017 USL season on December 6, 2016.

Miami FC 2
Tyrpak helped Miami FC advance to the finals and win the National Premier Soccer League (NPSL) National Championship.

Nashville SC
On August 8, 2018, Tyrpak signed with USL side Nashville SC. On November 14, 2018, Nashville announced that they had not re-signed Tyrpak for the 2019 season.

Austin Bold
On November 14, 2018, it was announced that Tyrpak would join Austin Bold FC ahead of their inaugural 2019 season.

Career statistics

References

External links 
 

1992 births
Living people
Soccer players from Austin, Texas
American soccer players
Houston Christian Huskies men's soccer players
Austin Aztex players
Chivas USA players
San Antonio Scorpions players
Sporting Kansas City II players
San Antonio FC players
Miami FC players
Nashville SC (2018–19) players
Austin Bold FC players
Association football forwards
Chivas USA draft picks
USL League Two players
Major League Soccer players
USL Championship players
North American Soccer League players
People from Dripping Springs, Texas